Patricia Sullivan may refer to:

Patricia A. Sullivan (chancellor), former chancellor of the University of North Carolina at Greensboro
Patricia A. Sullivan, lawyer who assisted captives held in extrajudicial detention at Guantanamo -- Guantanamo Bay attorneys
Patty Sullivan (born 1968), Canadian actress and television host
Patricia Sullivan (politician), former congressional candidate and leader of the Tea Party movement in Florida

See also
Patricia O'Sullivan, World War II spy
Patrick Sullivan (disambiguation)